Friends was a Swedish dansband or pop group formed in 1999 and made up of Stefan Brunzell, Tony Haglund, Kristian Hermanson, Nina Inhammar, Kim Kärnfalk and Peter Strandberg. They were put together from auditions on the reality television show Friends på turne (Friends on Tour), made by Bert Karlsson for TV4. The show was a success and Friends competed on Melodifestivalen 2000, reaching second place. They won Melodifestivalen 2001 with "Lyssna till ditt hjärta" and represented Sweden at the Eurovision Song Contest 2001 with the English version of the song, "Listen to Your Heartbeat.” Following their Eurovision participation, the Swedish delegation was forced to pay royalties to the team behind "Liefde is een kaartspel", the 1996 Belgian entry, making the song the first admitted case of plagiarism in Eurovision history.

The band split in 2002, with Inhammar and Kärnfalk forming their own duo Nina & Kim. In 2004, they attempted to represent Sweden with their song “En Gång För Alla” but came 7th in the second pre-selection round.  After 2006, Kärnfalk continued as a solo artist.

Discography

Albums
Friends på turné — 1999
Blickar som tänder — 2000 (rereleased in 2001 as Lyssna till ditt hjärta with 2 additional songs)
Listen to Your Heartbeat — 2001
Dance with Me — 2002
Best of Friends Vol. 1  — 2005
Best of Friends Vol. 2  — 2006

Singles 
Vi behöver varann / Hennes ögon — 1999
Vad jag än säger dig / Friends — 2000
När jag tänker på imorgon / När jag tänker på imorgon (singback) — 2000
Holiday / Nu väntar världen här utanför — 2000
Listen to your Heartbeat (P3 radio version) / Lyssna till ditt hjärta (Swedish original) / Listen to your Heartbeat (English original) / Lyssna till ditt hjärta/Listen to your heartbeat (instrumental version) — 2001
Aldrig igen (original Swedish version) / The One That You Need (original English version) / The One That You Need (beat bangers clubbers guide mix) / The One That You Need (beat bangers radio clearance mix) — 2002
In the Heat of the Night / Vår kärlek är het — 2002
Let Love Be Love  (with Johnny Logan)

References

Sources
"Friends firade hela natten", Aftonbladet, Feb. 24, 2001. 
"Kommer vi sämre än 16:e lämnar vi landet", Aftonbladet, May 11, 2001. 
"Gå ner i spagat och raka av sig håret", Aftonbladet, February 27, 2002. 
"En grammis på torsdag skulle inte sitta fel", Aftonbladet, February 11, 2002. 
"Ska man ha roligt bör man bli gay", Aftonbladet, February 23, 2001. 
"Här slutar hon – med en kyss", Aftonbladet, December 17, 2006.

External links
Site with all facts on Friends
Friends' thoughts on the ESC songs, Aftonbladet 

Eurovision Song Contest entrants for Sweden
Eurovision Song Contest entrants of 2001
Melodifestivalen winners
Musical groups established in 1999
Musical groups disestablished in 2002
Dansbands
Swedish pop music groups
1999 establishments in Sweden
2002 disestablishments in Sweden
English-language singers from Sweden
Melodifestivalen contestants of 2002
Melodifestivalen contestants of 2001
Melodifestivalen contestants of 2000